Jelena Janković was the defending champion, but chose not to participate that year.

Lindsay Davenport won in the final 6–2, 6–2, against Aravane Rezaï.

Seeds

Draw

Finals

Top half

Bottom half

Qualifying

Seeds

Qualifiers

Qualifying draw

First qualifier

Second qualifier

Third qualifier

Fourth qualifier

External links
Tournament profile (ITF)
Draw and Qualifying Draw (WTA)

WTA Auckland Open
2008 WTA Tour